Graphis sitapurensis is a species of script lichen in the family Graphidaceae. Found on the Andaman Islands, it was formally described as a new species in 2005 by Urmila Makhija and Bharati Adawadkar. The type specimen was collected from a moist deciduous forest in Sitapur (Diglipur Range, North Andaman Island). The species epithet refers to the type locality.

References

sitapurensis
Lichen species
Lichens described in 2005
Lichens of Indo-China